The following notable restaurants serve African cuisine:

 Abyssinian Kitchen – Portland, Oregon, U.S.
 Akadi – Portland, Oregon
 Queen of Sheba – Portland, Oregon

References

African cuisine
Lists of restaurants